Faruk Sokolović (born 18 September 1952) is a Bosnian film director, television producer, actor and screenwriter.

Filmography

Films

Television

References

External links

1952 births
Living people
Film people from Sarajevo
Bosniaks of Bosnia and Herzegovina
Bosnia and Herzegovina Muslims
Bosnia and Herzegovina film directors
Bosnia and Herzegovina screenwriters
Male screenwriters
Bosnia and Herzegovina male writers